Todd White is an American pastor and evangelist. He is founder and President of Lifestyle Christianity University in Watauga, Texas.

White is a former drug addict and atheist, and dates his conversion to 2004. He is the author of Life is Short - Leave a Legacy (2020). He was criticized in the documentary American Gospel: Christ Alone and responded by calling it "demonically inspired".

In 2022, White revealed that he has a heart condition in which his heart pumps at limited capacity.

References

Living people
American evangelists
American Pentecostal pastors
Prosperity theologians
Converts to Protestantism from atheism or agnosticism
Year of birth missing (living people)